Agraulomyrmex is a genus of ants in the subfamily Formicinae. The genus is known from southern Africa.

Species
 Agraulomyrmex meridionalis Prins, 1983 – South Africa
 Agraulomyrmex wilsoni Prins, 1983 – Zimbabwe

References

External links

Formicinae
Ant genera
Hymenoptera of Africa